Yudit Abreu (born April 23, 1969) is a male basketball player from Cuba. He played as a forward for the Cuba national basketball team in the 1990s.

References
Profile

1969 births
Living people
Cuban men's basketball players
Basketball players at the 1999 Pan American Games
Small forwards
Power forwards (basketball)
Pan American Games competitors for Cuba
1994 FIBA World Championship players